Antonis Nikolaidis (born 24 January 1967 in Islington, Greater London, Great Britain) is a British-born  Cypriot sport shooter. He captured a total of seven medals (three silver and four bronze) in men's skeet shooting at the ISSF World Cup series, and shared titles with Costas Stratis at the 1998 Commonwealth Games and with Georgios Achilleos in the doubles at the 2002 Commonwealth Games and 2006 Commonwealth Games.  Nikolaidis also competed for Cyprus in the same discipline in three editions of the Olympic Games (1992, 1996, and 2004), but he neither reached the final round, nor claimed an Olympic medal.

Sixteen years after competing in his first Olympics, Nikolaidis qualified for his fourth Cypriot team, as a 41-year-old, at the 2008 Summer Olympics in Beijing, by placing second from the 2007 ISSF World Cup series in Changwon, South Korea. He had finished on exactly the same score of 144 targets (120 in the preliminary rounds and 24 in the final) as France's Anthony Terras in men's skeet shooting, but narrowly lost the nation's first ever Olympic medal in a shoot-off by one point for a bonus of two.

Olympic results

References

External links
NBC Olympics Profile

1967 births
Living people
Cypriot male sport shooters
Skeet shooters
Olympic shooters of Cyprus
Shooters at the 1992 Summer Olympics
Shooters at the 1996 Summer Olympics
Shooters at the 2004 Summer Olympics
Shooters at the 2008 Summer Olympics
Shooters at the 1998 Commonwealth Games
Shooters at the 2002 Commonwealth Games
Shooters at the 2006 Commonwealth Games
Commonwealth Games gold medallists for Cyprus
Commonwealth Games bronze medallists for Cyprus
British people of Greek Cypriot descent
People from Islington (district)
Sportspeople from Limassol
Commonwealth Games medallists in shooting
Medallists at the 2006 Commonwealth Games